The Librairie philosophique J. Vrin is a bookshop and publisher in Paris, specializing in books on philosophy.

References

Bookstores of Paris
Book publishing companies of France
Retail companies established in 1911
1911 establishments in France
Publishing companies established in 1911